The King's Glory Education (KGE) Centre is a Cram school in Hong Kong founded in 1986 by Shum Yi-Fai (aka "Dr F. Shum"). It is targeted at students at S.6 level (previously S.5 and S.7 levels) who are sitting the HKDSE (combined from the former HKCEE and HKALE exams). It also provides P.4 to S.5 tutorial classes.

History 
The school started at an address in Ngau Tau Kok and provided tutorial classes to P.1 to F.3 students. In 1994, the school registered as a tutorial school and moved to Kowloon Bay. From that time, the school provided classes to P.3-F.7 students. In 1996, the school registered new branches in Mong Kok and Tsuen Wan. From 1998 to 2002, many of the school's branches were established all over Hong Kong. By 2007, King's Glory Education had established 11 branches, and it is one of the largest education corporations in Hong Kong.

K. Oten case

In February 2009, it was reported that former 'star teacher' and business partner Karson Oten Fan Karno, better known as "K. Oten", was in dispute with KGEC following his departure from the company to work for Modern Education. His employer terminated his contract in April 2006 when they discovered several breaches of contract. KGEC claimed damages of HK$10 million citing breach of contract, including collection of personal data from students, and taking up employment with a rival establishment within one year of his termination. Fan retorted that the contract expired in 2005 and that any subsequent contract was forged. Fan claims HK$2.65 million in unpaid profit share. On 15 July 2009, Fan was found guilty of breaching his employment contract, and his former employers were awarded damages in the sum of HK$8.87 million. The judge, who found the defence's student witnesses unreliable, disapproved of Oten's vulgar notes and use of trendy slang. Oten was ordered to pay half the defendants' legal costs. Later, Oten appealed to the court, but the court refused his appeal. Consequently, Oten was ordered to pay compensation to KGEC.

King's Glory Day School 
King's Glory Day School is a part of Kings Glory Educational Group, which provides the day-school courses to the S.5 and S.6 HKDSE students, and S.7 HKALE students.

References

External links
Official website

Secondary schools in Hong Kong
Test preparation companies
Education in Hong Kong